Jeanine Antoinette Hennis-Plasschaert (born 7 April 1973) is a Dutch politician and diplomat serving as Special Representative of the Secretary-General for the United Nations Assistance Mission for Iraq since 1 November 2018. She is a member of the People's Party for Freedom and Democracy (VVD).

Hennis-Plasschaert, a civil servant by occupation, was elected as a Member of the European Parliament for the Alliance of Liberals and Democrats for Europe group (ALDE) after the European Parliament election of 2004 on 20 July 2004; she was reelected after the European Parliament election of 2009. She was elected as a member of the House of Representatives after the general election of 2010 and resigned as a Member of the European Parliament the same day she took office as a Member of the House of Representatives on 17 June 2010.

Following the election of 2012 and after the cabinet formation the Second Rutte cabinet was formed with Hennis-Plasschaert becoming Minister of Defence. She stepped down as a member of the House of Representatives on 5 November 2012, the same day she took office as Minister of Defence. She served as Minister of Defence until her resignation on 4 October 2017. After the election of 2017 she returned as a member of the House of Representatives, serving from 23 March 2017 until 13 September 2018.

Early life and education
Jeanine Antoinette Plasschaert was born in Heerlen, Netherlands. She followed her secondary education at the St. Anthony's College in Gouda and studied at the European Secretarial Academy in Utrecht.

Political career

Member of the European Parliament, 2004–2010
In 2004 Hennis-Plasschaert was elected into the European Parliament for the VVD (European parliamentary affiliation: European Liberal Democrat and Reform Party) with 44,000 preference votes. In the European Parliament Hennis-Plasschaert was a member of the Committee on Transport and Tourism and a substitute for the Committee on Civil Liberties, Justice and Home Affairs. She also served as a member of the Delegation to the EU-Romania Joint Parliamentary Committee and a substitute for the Delegation to the EU–Turkey Joint Parliamentary Committee.

In May 2005 Hennis-Plasschaert filed a report for the European Parliament concerning the safety of airports. She argued that safety regulations against terrorist attacks, should only apply for airports, and not for the neighbouring areas. Furthermore, the costs and safety regulations should not distort free competition. In February 2006 she asked questions concerning the code of conduct for the media set up by the European Commission after the Jyllands-Posten Muhammad cartoons controversy. In March 2006 she wanted to enter Belarus to monitor the presidential election as an independent observer; however, she was refused entry.

In February 2010 Hennis-Plasschaert, as rapporteur on the issue, led the EP vote halting an EU-United States agreement which would have granted US authorities access to banking data of European citizens in the SWIFT network.

Career in national politics
Hennis-Plasschaert was put on the 4th place on her party's list for the Dutch general election of 2010 and became a member of the Dutch House of Representatives. She focused on matters of public safety, Dutch police, equality of treatment, LGBT rights, and emergency management. During the Dutch general election of 2012, she was number 4 on the list for the VVD and thus reelected. After the following cabinet formation she became the presumptive Minister of Defence for Cabinet Rutte II. In October 2015, she was named the most influential woman in the Netherlands.

Under Hennis-Plasschaert's leadership, the Netherlands committed in 2013 to purchasing 37 Lockheed Martin F-35 Lightning II fighter jets for about €4.5 billion to replace its ageing fleet of General Dynamics F-16 Fighting Falcon.

From 2014, Hennis-Plasschaert oversaw the Dutch mission of six F-16 jet fighters that carried out airstrikes against Islamic State targets in Iraq. On 29 January 2016, she extended the airstrikes into Syria.

For the 2017 national elections, Hennis-Plasschaert was ranked number two on the VVD's candidate list. Later that year, however, the Dutch Safety Board published a report highlighting serious failures in the Ministry of Defence surrounding an artillery training accident in Mali that killed two Dutch peacekeeping troops and wounded a third. In the wake of the report, Hennis-Plasschaert ordered extra checks on ammunition and medical care for troops on missions. She also started to wind down the Dutch contribution to the United Nations Multidimensional Integrated Stabilization Mission in Mali (MINUSMA), to which she had initially provided Boeing AH-64 Apache helicopters in 2013. Confronting continued criticism, however, she eventually announced her resignation after a debate in the House of Representatives on 3 October, handing in her resignation the following day. Her resignation came as negotiations to form a new third coalition government under Minister-President Mark Rutte entered their final phase.

Career in the United Nations
In August 2018, Hennis-Plasschaert was appointed by United Nations Secretary-General António Guterres as his Special Representative for Iraq and Head of the United Nations Assistance Mission for Iraq (UNAMI), thereby succeeding Ján Kubiš.

Activities in Iraq
In December 2019, Hennis-Plasschaert called for renewed efforts to restore civil balance and protections for free speech.

In a joint statement with the United Nations Assistance Mission for Iraq (UNAMI), Hennis-Plasschaert strongly condemned the August killings of two activists and attacks against others in the southern city of Basra. She urged for increased efforts to bring the perpetrators to justice.

On 28 January 2021, she visited the Independent High Electoral Commission (IHEC) in Baghdad. On 31 January 2021, she met Ali Akbar Velayati in Tehran, Iran, where she discussed the upcoming Iraqi parliamentary election.

Other activities
 Transatlantic Commission on Election Integrity (TCEI), Member (since 2018)
 World Economic Forum (WEF), Member of the Europe Policy Group (since 2017)
 World Economic Forum (WEF), Member of the Global Future Council on the Future of International Security

Personal life
She has been married to economist Erik-Jan Hennis since 27 September 2003 and has a stepson. They live in Nederhorst den Berg.

References

External links
Official

  (Jeanine) Hennis-Plasschaert Parlement & Politiek

|-

1973 births
Living people
Dutch management consultants
Dutch officials of the United Nations
Dutch expatriates in Belgium
Dutch women diplomats
Dutch women in politics
Female defence ministers
Members of the House of Representatives (Netherlands)
MEPs for the Netherlands 2004–2009
MEPs for the Netherlands 2009–2014
21st-century women MEPs for the Netherlands
Ministers of Defence of the Netherlands
Royal Netherlands Navy officers
People from Heerlen
People from Wijdemeren
People's Party for Freedom and Democracy MEPs
People's Party for Freedom and Democracy politicians
Special Representatives of the Secretary-General of the United Nations
Under-Secretaries-General of the United Nations
Women government ministers of the Netherlands
21st-century Dutch civil servants
21st-century Dutch diplomats
21st-century Dutch politicians